Most of César Franck's works seem to have been published during his lifetime, although only 21 works received a publisher's opus number. The mature published works were catalogued by Wilhelm Mohr in his Franck Werke Verzeichnis (FWV). He divided Franck's compositions into two main groups: instrumental works, M.1-48, and vocal works, M.49-91, arranging them by genre, and by composition date order within each genre. 

The CFF catalogue (see § External links) compiled by Joël-Marie Fauquet (published in 1999) details almost every known work by Franck, including many not listed by Mohr. In addition, many dates are listed in Fauquet's catalogue that are incorrect in Mohr's, or missing altogether.

Juvenile works
Franck wrote a number of juvenile works between 1834-7 to which he assigned an opus number; he later disowned all these early works, except for the Premiere Grande Fantaisie for piano Op.12 (1836), which he occasionally played in later life. These op. numbers are not to be confused with his mature published works, published with or without an opus number.

Op. 2 - Concerto No. 1, piano & orch., 1834? 
Op. 3 - Grand Rondo, piano, 1834
Op. 4 - Variations brillantes un thème original, piano,  1834
Op. 5 - Variations brillantes sur un air du Pré aux Clercs (Hérold), piano, 1834
Op. 6 - Grand Trio for piano, violin & cello, 1834
Op. 8 - Variations brillantes sur la ronde favorite de Gustave III (by Auber), piano & orch., 1834
Op. 9 - O salutaris, chorus & piano, 1835
Op. 10 - Première grande Sonate, piano, 1834/5
Op. 11 - Deuxième grand Concerto, piano & orch., 1835
Op. 12 - Première grande Fantaisie, piano, 1836 (only piece not to be disowned)
Op. 13 - Fantaisie (lost), piano, 1836
Op. 14 - Deuxième grande Fantaisie, piano, 1836
Op. 15 - Two mélodies for piano, 
Op. 18 - Deuxième Sonate, piano, 
Op. 19 - Troisième grande Fantaisie for piano

Mature works
This is an incomplete, sortable list of César Franck's mature works. The general layout of the table is according to Mohr's classification of the published compositions listed in FWV by genre and date, along with a few unpublished/unfinished works to which Mohr did not assign an FWV number; the latter are included in date order within each FWV genre. The corresponding publisher's Opus number is also shown where appropriate.

In some recorded performances, programme notes, and printed sheet music, Mohr's classification of FWV numbers is sometimes misunderstood and confused with opus numbers: e.g. "Fantaisie in C Major, Opus 16" may be given where "FWV 16" is meant. 

Contents
Chamber, M. 1-10
Piano, M. 11-23
Organ, M. 24-42
Orchestra, M. 43-48
Operas, M. 49-50
Sacred works with orchestra, M. 51-54
Sacred works with organ, M. 55-69
Solo songs with piano, M. 70-88
Chorus songs with piano, M. 89-91

Other miscellaneous works
Probably included in other works in the table
 Andantino (1889), for harmonium
 Petit offertoire, for harmonium
 Entrée, for harmonium
 Piece in Eb, for organ or harmonium
 Offertoire in A, for harmonium
 Offertoire sur un Noël bréton, CFF 34, for harmonium

References
 Notes

 Citations

External links
 List of works by César Franck at IMSLP, including CFF catalogue numbers.

Franck, Cesar